John Mann may refer to:

Entertainment
John Mann (British actor), British radio actor
John Mann (engineer), guitar engineer
John Mann (musician) (1962–2019), Canadian folk-rock musician and actor
Johnny Mann (1928–2014), American composer and recipient of multiple Grammy Awards

Sports
John Mann (Australian cricketer) (1919–1969), Australian cricketer
John Mann (English cricketer) (born 1983), English cricketer
John Mann (water polo) (born 1985), American water polo player
J. J. Mann (born 1991), American basketball player
John Pelham Mann (1919–2002), English cricketer and British Army officer
Johnny Mann (baseball) (1898–1977), American baseball player

Politicians
John Mann (Australian politician) (1869–1939), Australian politician
John Mann, Baron Mann (born 1960), British politician
John Mann (New Hampshire politician)

See also
Jackie Mann (1914–1995), British fighter pilot
John Man (author) (born 1941), British author
John Man (1512–1569), English churchman and diplomat
Jonathan Mann (disambiguation)
Mann (surname)